Reynold Rudolph Kraft (March 29, 1895 – November 7, 1951) was a player in the National Football League (NFL) for the Minneapolis Marines in 1922 as an end. He played at the collegiate level at the University of Illinois.

Biography
Kraft was born in 1895 in Menomonie, Wisconsin. He died in Chicago in 1951.

References

1895 births
1951 deaths
American football ends
Illinois Fighting Illini football players
Minneapolis Marines players
People from Menomonie, Wisconsin
Players of American football from Wisconsin